Ace Ventura: The CD-Rom Game is an adventure game released for the PC in August 1996, by 7th Level. The game is based on the animated series Ace Ventura: Pet Detective.

Gameplay
The game is a classic point and click adventure game that resembles the tone of the Leisure Suit Larry series by Sierra Games, in that it approaches the adult style of humor featured, which is implied but never shown, all while remaining faithful to the family-friendly tone established in the corresponding animated series broadcasting at the time.

Reception
GameSpot gave the game 6.6 out of 10, while Gamezilla gave it 58 out of 100. Cindy Yans of Computer Games Magazine gave the game two and a half stars out of five.

References

External links
 

1996 video games
Ace Ventura
Adventure games
Detective video games
Point-and-click adventure games
Video games based on animated television series
Video games developed in the United States
Windows games
Windows-only games
7th Level games